Colin Eden was a professor in management science and operations research at Strathclyde University.

Academic career 

Eden worked as an operational researcher in engineering upon bagging a doctorate. He then proceeded to academia, first working at the University of Bath Management School as a senior lecturer, then, as a reader.

He then assumed a professorship at Strathclyde University in management science. He subsequently became head of department at the Strathclyde Business School. And then Director of the Graduate School of Business at Strathclyde, and then finally Vice Dean.

His research interests is in business strategy, project management, and operations research.

He is widely published in respected management, project management and management science journals such as: Journal of Management Studies; and European Journal of Operational Research.  His significant contributions are i) in the development of SODA as a problem structuring method; setting out a clear view of the nature Action Research in the study of management and organisations; iii) the development and theoretical grounding for strategy development as negotiation.

He has been awarded many accolades including lifetime achievement awards from the OR Society (Beale Medal 2007)and from INFORMS GND Section (2008).

Select Publications 

 Eden, C., 1995. Strategic options development and analysis (SODA)
 
 Eden, C., Ackermann, F. and Cropper, S., 1992. The analysis of cause maps. Journal of Management Studies, 29(3), pp. 309–324. doi: 10.1111/j.1467-6486.1992.tb00667.x
 Eden, C., 1992. On the nature of cognitive maps. Journal of Management Studies, 29(3), pp. 261–265. doi: 10.1111/j.1467-6486.1992.tb00664.x
 Eden, Colin and Ackermann, Fran., 1998. Making Strategy: The Journey of Strategic Management. London: Sage.
 Eden, C.; Ackermann, F., and Williams, T. The Amoebic Growth of Project Costs. Project Management Journal. 2005; 36(2):15-27.
 Eden, C. and Huxham, C., 2006. Researching Organizations Using Action Research. Clegg, S.; Hardy, C., and Nord, W., Eds. Handbook of Organization Studies. Beverly Hills: Sage; pp. 388–408.
 Ackermann, Fran and Eden, Colin., 2011. Making Strategy: Mapping Out Strategic Success. London: Sage.

References

External links 

 Introduction to Making Strategy

Academics of the University of Strathclyde
Management scientists
British social scientists
British business theorists
British operations researchers
Year of birth missing (living people)
Living people